Nathaniel N. Holden (born June 19, 1929) is a Los Angeles County politician who served four years in the California State Senate and 16 years on the Los Angeles City Council.

Biography

Upbringing, education and family
Holden was born in Macon, Georgia, the son of a railroad brakeman in the Central of Georgia yards. He moved with his mother and brothers to a cold-water flat in Elizabeth, New Jersey, when he was 10; he quit high school at age 16, when, although he was under age, he enlisted in the Army, where he became a military policeman. Back home, he earned a high school diploma in night school and later studied design and engineering in the evenings at West Coast University. He worked for Bell Laboratories in New Jersey, then moved to California in 1955 and worked as an aerospace engineer. He has two sons, Chris Holden, a California State Assemblymember, and Reginald Holden, a Los Angeles County Deputy Sheriff.

Description and personality
Holden was an amateur boxer as a teenager, weighing only 167 pounds. At age 59, he was a "tall, gray-haired dignified-looking man in a nicely conservative suit." Holden completed the Los Angeles Marathon in 1990 and 1991, when he was in his sixties.

He had two sides to his personality, Los Angeles Times reporter Bill Boyarsky wrote in 1989 — "The Nice Nate" and "The Mean Nate." On one hand, Holden was "a gentle, considerate, compassionate person much of the time." On the other hand, Boyarsky wrote, Holden is marked by a "hostile toughness . . . when he discusses the way black leaders refused to back him in unsuccessful races and in his election to the council." Fellow councilman John Ferraro said of Holden, "He is gruff and he is rough, but he has a big heart."

Early political career
In California, he became active in Democratic politics; he was a member of the "steering committee for the California Democratic Council's peace delegation" and an officer of the Alta Loma Democratic Club. Holden made his first run for public office in 1968, when he was an unsuccessful candidate in California's 26th congressional district, which at the time included Beverly Hills, part of Culver City, most of Venice and some of Santa Monica and West Los Angeles. He became president of the CDC in 1970 and that year made two more runs for Congress.

State Senate

Holden began his service as a state senator in 1974, but gave up his office after four years to campaign unsuccessfully for the Congressional seat ultimately won by Julian C. Dixon.

City Council

Elections
1987: Holden took a leave from his job as assistant chief deputy to Los Angeles County Supervisor Kenneth Hahn to run against Homer Broome Jr. for the 10th District seat that had been vacated by the resignation of Dave Cunningham. Holden won by a 2–1 margin, even though Broome had been endorsed by Mayor Tom Bradley. Another candidate was Esther M. Lofton, who received fewer than 100 votes.

1989: Holden took on Mayor Bradley directly when he entered the race for mayor. He angered some of his constituents during the campaign when he supported the proposed breakup of the Los Angeles Unified School District. It was noted just before the election that Bradley's campaign fund vastly surpassed Holden's — $1,085,861 to $67,252.   Bradley received 52 percent of vote to win in the April primary.

1991: Lofton, 60, a former schoolteacher "with no political base," challenged Holden again, stating she would not accept campaign contributions. When the votes were counted, Lofton had won an "astounding 28%," the Los Angeles Times remarked editorially, ascribing the large percentage to Holden's "hands-off policy regarding Police Chief Daryl Gates.

1995: Holden was challenged in the April primary by Deputy District Attorney Kevin A. Ross and by Rhodes Scholar and Yale Law School graduate J. Stanley (Stan) Sanders. In the final election against Sanders in June, Holden received 54% of the vote and was elected.

Legislation
1987: Forbidding the sale or manufacture of realistic toy guns. Bill passed.

1990: Requiring buyers of Rolex watches to register the serial number with police, to make it difficult for crooks to sell them. Introduced in the wake of a rash of Rolex thefts of about one a day, with some owners killed.

1999: Requiring cable companies to remove sneakers tied together and left dangling from overhead lines. Holden said they were "menacing signals of gang territory and drug sales." Police officials said they were just pranks. Bill passed.

Legacy

 The Nate Holden Performing Arts Center at 4718 West Washington Boulevard is named in his honor. 
 Changed the restrictions that prevented women from acquiring a mortgage without the signature of a man. 
 Was the author of the legislation that led the State of California ( the first state in the nation) to recognize the Martin Luther King Holiday.

References

Further reading
 Beyda v. City of Los Angeles (sexual harassment appeal)
 Erin J. Aubry in LA Weekly on the 1999 10th District election
 Join California Nate Holden

1929 births
Living people
Democratic Party California state senators
Holden, Nate
People from Macon, Georgia
Politicians from Elizabeth, New Jersey
African-American state legislators in California
United States Army soldiers
African-American city council members in California
20th-century American politicians
21st-century American politicians
20th-century African-American politicians
21st-century African-American politicians
Candidates in the 1989 United States elections